Enrichment may refer to:

 Behavioral enrichment, the practice of providing animals under managed care with stimuli such as natural and artificial objects
 Data enrichment, appending or enhancing data with relevant context from other sources, see data management
 Enrichment factor, used to describe bodies of mineral ore
 Enrichment in education: activities outside the formal curriculum, or an extra program for the most able students
 Environmental enrichment, how the brain is affected by the stimulation of its information processing provided by its surroundings
 The process of adding nutrients to cereals or grain, see food fortification
 The process of adding sugar to grape must during winemaking in order to achieve a higher alcohol content of the wine, more commonly referred to as chaptalization
 The process of enhancing breathing gas for scuba diving (e.g. in Enriched Air Nitrox).
 Job enrichment, improving work processes and environments so they are more satisfying for employees
 Nuclear enrichment, the process of increasing the Uranium-235 content of nuclear fuel in preparation for nuclear power plants or nuclear weapons
 The United States Enrichment Corporation, a manufacturer of enriched uranium
 Unjust enrichment, in civil law, a term for someone who has benefitted another party with the expectation of compensation, but who has not been justly compensated
 The Enrichment Center Percussion Ensemble from the Enrichment Centre in Winston-Salem NC
 The Living Enrichment Center, a church in Portland, Oregon
 The notion of enriched category in mathematics
 The analysis of gene product annotations using GO Term Enrichment in biology
 The use of an enrichment culture, to select for the growth of a particular microorganism
 The paradox of enrichment, a principle of ecology where an abundance of prey tends to destabilize the predator population
 Enrich (comics) (1929–2023), Spanish comic writer